Finley John Stevens (born 10 April 2003) is a professional footballer who plays as a right-back for  club Brentford. Stevens is a graduate of the Arsenal Academy and began his senior career in non-League football with Worthing. He is a current Wales U21 international.

Club career

Early years
Stevens began his career in the Arsenal Academy at the age of six. He progressed to U16 level, before being released at the end of the 2018–19 season and entering the youth system at Isthmian League Premier Division club Worthing. Stevens quickly broke into the first team squad and made 20 appearances during the abandoned 2019–20 season, scoring one goal. He was developed as a right back and encouraged to play in central midfield. Stevens departed Woodside Road in July 2020.

Brentford
On 28 July 2020, Stevens transferred to the B team at Brentford on a two-year contract, with the option of a further year, for an undisclosed fee. A number of players on international duty saw Stevens called into the first team squad on the opening day of the 2020–21 season and he remained an unused substitute during an EFL Cup first round shoot-out victory over Wycombe Wanderers. Three weeks later, he made his debut for the club as a substitute for Saïd Benrahma after 79 minutes of a 3–0 fourth round victory over West London rivals Fulham. Stevens became a permanent addition to the first team training group and was an unused substitute on 28 occasions during the 2020–21 regular season. He made four further appearances before signing a new three-year contract, with a one-year option, on 11 May 2021. Stevens failed to appear during Brentford's three 2021 playoff matches, but he won a promotion medal by virtue of being an unused substitute during the Final victory over Swansea City. In recognition of his performances for both the first team and B team during the 2020–21 season, Stevens was awarded the B Team Player of the Year award.

Stevens trained with the first team group during the 2021–22 pre-season and was named in each matchday squad during the period. He was a frequent inclusion in the first team group and on the substitutes' bench during the regular season. Following two cup appearances, Stevens made his Premier League debut as a substitute for Sergi Canós after 76 minutes of a 4–1 defeat to Southampton on 11 January 2022. He finished the 2021–22 season with four first team appearances. During the 2022 off-season, Stevens' progress was recognised with promotion into the first team squad and a new five-year contract, with a one year option.

Stevens began the 2022–23 season behind new signing Aaron Hickey and stand-in Kristoffer Ajer in the right back pecking order. Following just a single EFL Cup start during the opening month of the season, Stevens joined Championship club Swansea City on a season-long loan on the final day of the summer transfer window. He made just five substitute appearances before being recalled on 1 January 2023.

International career
Owing to his Cardiff-born grandfather, Stevens was contacted by Wales U21 manager Paul Bodin in January 2021, about the possibility of pledging his international allegiance to Wales. In March 2021, Stevens was called into the Wales U21 squad for a training camp and friendly match versus Republic of Ireland U21. He played the full 90 minutes of the 2–1 defeat. Ahead of the U21 team's first match of the 2022–23 season, Stevens was named vice-captain of the squad by incoming manager Matt Jones.

Career statistics

Honours
Brentford
EFL Championship play-offs: 2021

Individual
Brentford B Player of the Year: 2020–21

References

External links

Fin Stevens at brentfordfc.com

2003 births
Living people
Footballers from Brighton
English footballers
Welsh footballers
Wales under-21 international footballers
Association football defenders
Association football midfielders
Worthing F.C. players
Brentford F.C. players
Isthmian League players
English Football League players
English people of Welsh descent
Premier League players
Swansea City A.F.C. players